Dzerkalne, or Zerkalnoye, is a village in the Amvrosiivka Raion, Donetsk Oblast, Ukraine, 39.9 kilometres south-east from Donetsk. Population: 65 (2001).

2014 pro-Russian unrest in Ukraine 
During the Battle of Ilovaisk, on August 24, 2014, a column of the Russian 331st Airborne Regiment was hit by Ukrainian troops of the 51st Mechanized Brigade near Kuteinykove village. Ten armed Russian paratroopers were captured later during the night near Dzerkalne, just a mile away from where the column was destroyed. On the evening of August 25, the Security Service of Ukraine (SBU) announced the capture. Russia, however, said that the ten Russian soldiers, 20 kilometers from the Russian border, only entered Ukraine by mistake.

References 

Villages in Donetsk Raion